Manuel Sanchís Guarner (Valencia, 1911–1981) was a Spanish  philologist, historian and writer.

He was an author of a vast work ranging from studies of linguistics, literature, history, ethnography to popular culture, basically centered on the Valencian Community, but also on the rest of the  territories of the ancient Crown of Aragon and the whole Iberian peninsula.

His most famous contributions were La llengua dels valencians (The language of the Valencians), first published in 1933, la Gramàtica valenciana (Valencian grammar) (1950), Els pobles valencians parlen els uns dels altres (Valencian towns speak about each other), or Aproximació a la història de la llengua catalana (An approach to the history of the Catalan language) (1980). He also collaborated in some major works such as Diccionari Català-Valencià-Balear (Catala-Valencian-Balearic dictionary) or Història del País Valencià (History of the Valencian Country). In 1974, he was rewarded with the Honor Prize of the Catalan Letters.

External links
 Manuel Sanchis Guarner Archive (Biblioteca Valenciana)
 Sanchis Guarner at the AELC (Association of Writers in Catalan Language) from which he was a member. Page in Catalan, English and Spanish.

1911 births
1981 deaths
People from Valencia
Writers from the Valencian Community
Spanish male writers
Catalan-language writers
Members of the Institute for Catalan Studies